Pierre Véry (17 November 1900 in Bellon, Charente – 12 October 1960 in Paris) was a French novelist and screenwriter.

Filmography
Boys' School, directed by Christian-Jaque (1938, based on the novel Les Disparus de Saint-Agil)
Who Killed Santa Claus?, directed by Christian-Jaque (1941, based on the novel L'Assassinat du père Noël)
It Happened at the Inn, directed by Jacques Becker (1943, based on the novel Goupi-Mains rouges)
, directed by Louis Daquin (1943, based on the novel Madame et le Mort)
Land Without Stars, directed by Georges Lacombe (1946, based on the novel Le Pays sans étoiles)
Old Boys of Saint-Loup, directed by Georges Lampin (1950, based on the novel Les Anciens de Saint-Loup)
Great Man, directed by Yves Ciampi (1951, based on the novel Un grand patron)
Les Disparus de Saint-Agil, directed by Jean-Louis Benoît (1991, TV film, based on the novel Les Disparus de Saint-Agil)
Goupi-Mains rouges, directed by Claude Goretta (1993, TV film, based on the novel Goupi-Mains rouges)

Screenwriter
 (dir. Christian-Jaque, 1939)
 The Murderer is Afraid at Night (dir. Jean Delannoy, 1942)
 (dir. Willy Rozier, 1942)
Land Without Stars (dir. Georges Lacombe, 1946)
Martin Roumagnac (dir. Georges Lacombe, 1946)
The Charterhouse of Parma (dir. Christian-Jaque, 1948)
Crossroads of Passion (dir. Ettore Giannini, 1948)
Suzanne and the Robbers (dir. Yves Ciampi, 1949)
 (dir. Georges Lampin, 1949)
Singoalla (dir. Christian-Jaque, 1949)
Old Boys of Saint-Loup (dir. Georges Lampin, 1950)
Lost Souvenirs (dir. Christian-Jaque, 1950)
Great Man (dir. Yves Ciampi, 1951)
The Slave (dir. Yves Ciampi, 1953)
Le Guérisseur (dir. Yves Ciampi, 1953)
Papa, Mama, the Maid and I (dir. Jean-Paul Le Chanois, 1954)
Papa, maman, ma femme et moi (dir. Jean-Paul Le Chanois, 1955)
 (dir. Gilles Grangier, 1958)
 (dir. André Michel, 1958)

References 

1900 births
1960 deaths
20th-century French non-fiction writers
French children's writers
French male screenwriters
20th-century French screenwriters
Place of birth missing
Place of death missing
20th-century French male writers